Balochi cuisine is the food and cuisine of the Baloch people from the Balochistan region, comprising the Pakistani Balochistan province, the Sistan and Baluchestan Province in Iran and Balochistan, Afghanistan. Baloch food has a regional variance in contrast to the many cuisines of Pakistan and Iran.

Sajji is a Balochi dish which usually consists of lamb or chicken, stuffed with rice, baked inside an oven and marinated in salt and spices.

See also 

 Iranian cuisine
 Afghan cuisine

References

 
Iranian cuisine
Afghan cuisine
Pakistani cuisine
South Asian cuisine
Cuisine
Cuisine by ethnicity